Otopharynx lithobates is a species of cichlid endemic to Lake Malawi.  This species can reach a length of  TL.  This species can also be found in the aquarium trade. As O. walteri this species was known as Aristochromis deep in the aquarium trade.

References

lithobates
Fish of Lake Malawi
Fish of Malawi
Fish described in 1989
Taxonomy articles created by Polbot